ICU Medical, Inc. is a San Clemente, California-based company with global operations that develops, manufactures, and sells medical technologies used in vascular therapy, oncology, and critical care applications. 

ICU Medical's products are designed to prevent bloodstream infections and protect healthcare workers from exposure to infectious diseases or hazardous drugs. ICU Medical's product line includes intravenous therapy (IV) products, pumps, needle-free vascular access devices, custom infusion sets, closed system hazardous drug handling devices and systems, sensor catheters, needle-free closed blood sampling systems, and hemodynamic monitoring systems. 

ICU Medical's products are designed to prevent bloodstream infections and protecting healthcare workers from exposure to infectious diseases or hazardous drugs. In addition, the company's IV medication compounding and delivery products are designed to improve medication and dosing accuracy and improve clinical workflows.  ICU Medical has been named one of the 100 Most Trustworthy Companies in America by Forbes Magazine.

History

The company was founded in 1984 by George "Doc" Lopez, MD who developed a product known as the ClickLock to better secure IV lines after he lost a patient due to an accidental disconnect. The ClickLock consisted of a protected needle and locking housing that prevented health care workers from being accidentally stuck by the I.V. needles.

In 2006, ICU Medical introduced its first products for oncology. The ChemoClave system from ICU Medical is a closed system transfer device (CSTD) that allows pharmacists and nurses to safely mix and administer hazardous drugs used to treat cancer patients without exposing themselves to these drugs.

ICU Medical acquired the former Abbott Laboratories Critical Care business from Hospira in 2009 following a four-year business arrangement in which ICU acted as the manufacturer of the Hospira critical care product line. The acquisition allowed ICU to obtain new manufacturing space in Salt Lake City, Utah, while it also broadened the company's footprint in the hospital marketplace with products designed for use in high acuity clinical settings like the operating room and intensive care unit.   With the February 2017 acquisition of the Hospira Infusion Systems business from Pfizer, ICU Medical became one of the leading pure-play infusion companies.

Products

Infusion therapy
Over 90% of hospitalized patients receive some form of IV therapy during their stay. As a result, infusion devices must be safe, reliable, and cost-effective. ICU Medical's infusion therapy products include a line of needle-free IV connectors that provide significant clinical advantage over other devices, along with a range of custom and stock infusion sets and kits for adult, pediatric, and neonatal applications.

ICU Medical's line of needle-free connectors are mechanically and microbiologically closed systems protecting the patient's catheter from contamination that can otherwise lead to bloodstream infections. They feature a unique passive technology that cannot accept a needle, ensuring compliance with needle-free policies. These connectors can be used on all peripheral, arterial, and central venous catheters for the administration of IV fluids or medication, and can be used with blood products. No additional components or adapters are required to access the device, and no end caps are required for sterility. Featuring a dedicated internal fluid path, at no time does the internal fluid path come into contact with the exterior or outer housing of the devices. In addition, the devices' unique design features may help reduce the risk of bacterial contamination:

The company launched the Neutron catheter patency device, a needle-free infusion access device that is the first and only device the U.S. Food and Drug Administration (FDA) cleared to claim the ability to eliminate all types of reflux into a catheter. Blood reflux, or blood backing up into the catheter, has been shown to cause catheter occlusion. Blood reflux can lead to an intraluminal thrombus, which may result in an inability to infuse IV fluids/medications, an inability to withdraw blood, and an increased risk of infection  The Neutron device eliminates reflux caused by external factors such as connecting and disconnecting a luer, and is the only device that can eliminate reflux caused by changes to a patients vascular pressure changes caused by coughing, sneezing, crying or vomiting. In clinical use, Neutron has been shown to reduce the instance of catheter occlusion by 50%.

In 2015, ICU Medical acquired Excelsior Medical Corporation, a manufacturer of healthcare devices used to disinfect and protect access into a patient's bloodstream. Acquired products included the SwabCap and SwabFlush, as well as pre-filled saline and heparin flush syringes. The total purchase price for Excelsior was $59.5 million, however ICU immediately sold the operating assets of SwabFlush and pre-filled syringe businesses to Medline Industries, Inc. for $27 million.

Oncology
Cancer claimed the lives of an estimated 7.9 million people in 2007 alone. Experts expect this number to double before 2030. The unsafe handling of hazardous drugs used to treat many forms of cancer has been recognized since the 1970s as a significant health hazard to workers. Studies have shown that workers can be at risk of exposure to these drugs throughout their lifecycle—from manufacture to distribution to use in the clinical or home  care environment and all the way through to waste disposal. Healthcare workers who handle these drugs may be exposed  by inhaling aerosols or dust generated during pharmacy preparation and nursing administration, or by direct contact with the skin during accidental needlesticks, spills, or spill cleanup.

ICU Medical's oncology product line is designed specifically to keep healthcare workers and patients safe from exposure to hazardous drugs. The line includes the ChemoClave closed system transfer device (CSTD) that allows for the safe mixing and administration of hazardous drugs. Recent studies found that the ChemoClave system protects clinicians from exposure to hazardous drugs, increases clinician satisfaction rates, costs less and generates less biohazardous waste than other commercially available CSTDs. In 2012, the company introduced the Diana Hazardous drug compounding system, a user-controlled automated system that helps protect clinicians from exposure to hazardous drugs and accidental needlesticks while protecting the patient preparation from exposure to environmental contaminants.

Critical care
ICU Medical's line of critical care products provides real-time hemodynamic monitoring, blood conservation solutions, oximetry catheter technology that helps optimize oxygen supply and demand, critical care catheters with no natural rubber latex components, and accurate and reliable hemodynamic transducer kits. The critical care portfolio provides clinicians with accurate, reliable, and real-time access to their patients’ cardiovascular and hemodynamic status in surgical and intensive care settings. In addition, ICU Medical's line of advanced sensor catheters, having no natural rubber latex components, helps keep patients safe from potentially lethal allergic reactions. Formerly the Abbott critical care business unit, ICU Medical acquired the Critical Care business from Hospira (itself a spin-off from Abbott) in 2009. Since then, the company has been focusing on streamlining and modernizing the manufacturing processes for these products and actively developing new solutions to bring to market.

In 2016, ICU Medical Critical Care received United States Food and Drug Administration (FDA) 510(k) clearance for its new Cogent 2-in-1 hemodynamic monitoring system, the first and only hemodynamic monitoring system to accept both minimally invasive and invasive inputs, letting clinicians use a single monitor regardless of fluctuations in patient acuity and monitoring requirements.

References

External links
 Corporate Website

Companies listed on the Nasdaq
1984 establishments in California
American companies established in 1984
Health care companies established in 1984
Medical technology companies of the United States
Health care companies based in California
Companies based in San Clemente, California
Medical device manufacturers